The British League Knockout Cup 1967 was the 29th edition of the Knockout Cup. The cup was won by Coventry Bees.

First round

Second round

Third round

Semi-final

Final (First Leg)

Scorers
Coventry Bees
 1)  Nigel Boocock 2* 2 2 3 3 - 12 (1)
 2)  Les Owen 3 3 1* 0 2* - 9 (2)
 3)  Roger Hill 2 0 1 1* 0 - 4 (1)
 4)  Rick France F Ef 3 2 3 - 8
 5)  Col Cottrell 2* 2 1 2* 1 - 8 (2)
 6)  Ron Mountford 3 1* 3 3 3 - 13 (1)
 7)  Clive Hitch 2* 1 - 3 (1)

West Ham Hammers
 1)  Ken McKinlay 1 3 3 3 3 2 - 15
 2)  Malcolm Simmons 0 Ef 0 TS TS - 0
 3)  Norman Hunter 3 1 0 2 2 1 - 9
 4)  Tony Clarke 1 TS 2 0 TS - 3
 5)  Sverre Harrfeldt 1 3 2 1 1* 0 - 8 (1)
 6)  Brian Leonard 0 2* 1* 0 0 0 - 3 (2)
 7)  George Barclay 1 0 - 1

Heat by Heat
 Ht 01: Owen, Boocock, McKinlay, Simmons 67.8
 Ht 02: Hunter, Hill, Clarke, France (f) 69.0
 Ht 03: Owen, Hitch, Barclay, Simmons (ef) 70.2
 Ht 04: McKinlay, Boocock, Hunter, Hill 68.0
 Ht 05: Mountford, Cottrell, Harrfeldt, Leonard 69.4
 Ht 06: McKinlay, Boocock, Owen, Hunter 69.0
 Ht 07: Harrfeldt, Leonard, Hill, France (ef) 70.0
 Ht 08: McKinlay, Cottrell, Mountford, Simmons 70.0
 Ht 09: France, Clarke, Hitch, Barclay 71.0
 Ht 10: Boocock, Harrfeldt, Leonard, Owen 70.0
 Ht 11: Mountford, Hunter, Cottrell, Clarke 70.2
 Ht 12: McKinlay, France, Hill, Leonard 70.2
 Ht 13: Mountford, Cottrell, Harrfeldt, Leonard 70.6
 Ht 14: Boocock, Hunter, Harrfeldt, Hill 71.0
 Ht 15: Mountford, Owen, Hunter, Leonard 71.6
 Ht 16: France, McKinlay, Cottrell, Harrfeldt 69.6

Final (Second Leg)

Scorers
West Ham Hammers
 1)  Ken McKinlay 3 1* 3 1 1* - 9 (2)
 2)  Malcolm Simmons 0 3 2* 3 3 - 11 (1)
 3)  Norman Hunter Ef 2 3 2 2 - 9
 4)  Tony Clarke 1 0 2 0 2 - 5
 5)  Sverre Harrfeldt FNS N N N N - 0
 6)  Brian Leonard 3 1* 3 2 2* - 11 (2)
 7)  Stan Stevens 0 0 2 0 1 1* - 4 (1)

Coventry Bees
 1)  Nigel Boocock 2 3 3 3 3 - 14
 2)  Les Owen 1* 2 0 1 0 - 4 (1)
 3)  Roger Hill 2* F 0 0 N - 2 (1)
 4)  Rick France 3 1 3 2 3 - 12
 5)  Col Cottrell 2 1* 0 0 1 - 4 (1)
 6)  Ron Mountford 1* 2 2 3 1 - 9 (1)
 7)  Clive Hitch 1* 1 0 - 2 (1)

Heat by Heat
Heat by Heat
 Ht 01: McKinlay, Boocock, Owen, Simmons 73.0
 Ht 02: France, Hill, Clarke, Hunter (ef) 74.0
 Ht 03: Simmons, Owen, Hitch, Stevens 74.6
 Ht 04: Boocock, Hunter, McKinlay, Hill (f) 73.8
 Ht 05: Leonard, Cottrell, Mountford, Stevens, Harrfeldt (f ns) 74.4
 Ht 06: McKinlay, Simmons, France, Hill 74.6
 Ht 07: Hunter, Mountford, Cottrell, Clarke 75.0
 Ht 08: Boocock, Stevens, Leonard, Owen 75.2
 Ht 09: France, Clarke, Hitch, Stevens 75.4
 Ht 10: Simmons, Mountford, McKinlay, Cottrell 74.8
 Ht 11: Leonard, France, Stevens, Hill 75.2
 Ht 12: Boocock, Hunter, Owen, Clarke 75.2
 Ht 13: Mountford, Leonard, Stevens, Cottrell 76.0
 Ht 14: France, Hunter, McKinlay, Owen 75.4
 Ht 15: Simmons, Leonard, Mountford, Hitch 75.2
 Ht 16: Boocock, Clarke, Cottrell, Harrfeldt (ns) 75.8

See also
List of United Kingdom Speedway League Champions
Knockout Cup (speedway)

References

 
Speedway leagues
1967 in British motorsport
1967 in speedway
Speedway competitions in the United Kingdom